Cannock is a town and an unparished area in the district of Cannock Chase, Staffordshire, England.  It contains 17 buildings that are recorded in the National Heritage List for England.  Of these, three are listed at Grade II*, the middle grade, and the others are at Grade II, the lowest grade.  The listed buildings include a church and associated structures, houses, shops, public houses, a former chapel and its manse, a conduit head, and a school.


Key

Buildings

References

Citations

Sources

Lists of listed buildings in Staffordshire
Listed